Anton Reichard von Mauchenheim genannt Bechtolsheim (9 July 1896 – 9 February 1961) was a German army officer.

He was born in Würzburg, and was a brother of Theodor von Bechtolsheim. From 1937 he served as military attaché in London. In 1939 he joined the General Staff of the 6th Army, as operations officer. From 1941 he was chief of the General Staff of the XXIII Army Corps, and subsequently the XXIX Army Corps. From 1943 to 1944 he commanded the 257th Infantry Division at the Eastern Front. In December 1944 he joined the LXXI Army Corps in Norway, and was commanding general of the corps from March 1945, with the rank of General of the Artillery. From 9 May 1945 he was detached as liaison officer for the surrendered German Armed Forces in the turnover negotiations with the Allied Forces.

Awards
His decorations included the German Cross in gold from 1942, and the Prussian Iron Cross, First and Second Class, from World War I.

References

1896 births
1961 deaths
German Army personnel of World War I
German Army generals of World War II
Generals of Artillery (Wehrmacht)
Recipients of the Gold German Cross
Military personnel from Würzburg